Colonel John William Fane DL JP (1 September 1804 – 19 November 1875),  of Wormsley nr. Watlington, Oxfordshire, was a British Conservative politician.

Background
A member of the Fane family headed by the Earl of Westmorland, Fane was the son of John Fane, of Wormsley, Oxfordshire, and Elizabeth, daughter of William Lowndes-Stone-Norton. He attended Rugby School and entered St John's College, Cambridge in 1823, though he does not appear to have taken a degree.

Political career
Fane was High Sheriff of Oxfordshire for 1854 and, in 1862, was returned to Parliament as one of three representatives for the Oxfordshire constituency, a seat he held until 1868. He was also a Deputy Lieutenant and Justice of the Peace for Oxfordshire.

Family
Fane was married four times. He married firstly Catherine, daughter of Sir Benjamin Hobhouse, 1st Baronet, in 1826. After her death in November 1828, he married secondly Lady Ellen Catherine, daughter of Thomas Parker, 5th Earl of Macclesfield, in 1829. After her death in September 1844, he married thirdly Charlotte, daughter of Theodore Broadhead, in 1845. After her death in May 1855, he married fourthly Victoria, daughter of William Temple, in 1856. There were children from all four marriages. Fane died in November 1875, aged 71. His fourth wife later remarried and died in February 1912.

References

External links 
 
 Darryl Lundy's thePeerage.com page
 

1804 births
1875 deaths
Alumni of St John's College, Cambridge
Conservative Party (UK) MPs for English constituencies
UK MPs 1859–1865
UK MPs 1865–1868
Deputy Lieutenants of Oxfordshire
John
High Sheriffs of Oxfordshire